= Weddel & Co BV v Commission =

- Court: European Court of Justice
- Citation: (1992) C-54/90

Keywords
- Free movement of goods

Weddel & Co BV v Commission (1992) C-54/90 is an EU law case, concerning the Commission of the European Union's official exercise of power.

== Facts ==
Weddel & CO BV claimed that a Commission official should be allowed to give evidence before a national court concerning licences to import beef from the US and Canada. Weddel & CO BV had brought an action for annulment of Regulation No 2806/87, which restricted the amount of beef it could import, and asked a Commission official to give evidence that he had assured a Dutch authority that no ceiling would be imposed. The Commission denied the official the authority to give evidence, alleging it could do this under articles 17 to 19 of the Staff Regulations, on the ground that the same facts were pending in another case, Weddel v Commission. The Commission argued that the Staff Regulations article 17 prohibited officials from disclosing confidential information obtained from third parties or disclosing to unauthorised persons any document or information not already made public.

== Judgment ==
The Court of Justice held that the Commission official could be required to give evidence in the national court.

20 This restrictive interpretation does not follow from the wording of the said Article 19 of the Staff Regulations. On the contrary, the wording of that provision in its various language versions shows that where an official, as in the present case, is called to give evidence before a national court on the subject of information allegedly disclosed to third parties by him in his official capacity, he must obtain prior permission for this from his institution, and no distinction is to be made in this respect between information covered and information not covered by his duty of discretion.

[...]

The alternative plea in law

21 In the event that Article 19 of the Staff Regulations is applicable, the applicant puts forward the alternative argument that the Commission has not demonstrated that the interests of the Community, within the meaning of that provision, require the official to be refused permission to give evidence. The applicant also argues that permission could not be refused, since the refusal to testify could have entailed criminal or similar consequences for the official in question.

22 On the first point, it should be noted that the Commission's only argument relating to the interests of the Community is the argument concerning the proper management of the common organization of markets.

23 It must be observed in this respect that the sole aim of the testimony sought was to ascertain whether the official had provided the Produktschap with a particular interpretation of Community rules on agriculture.

24 Such testimony, in the circumstances of the case, is not liable to affect the relations which the Commission's services must have with national administrations, and is consequently not liable to compromise the proper management of the common organization of markets.

25 The Commission was therefore wrong in considering that the interests of the Community prevented permission being given to its official to give evidence, as sought by the applicant.

== See also ==
- European Union law
